The  is the highest national order of Turkmenistan. It can only be awarded to the current president, and only once in the president's tenure, for "outstanding achievements in domestic and foreign policies." The order was created for Gurbanguly Berdimuhamedow by Turkmenistan's rubberstamp parliament in 2007, and Berdimuhamedow was subsequently made the first ever recipient on his 50th birthday.

References

External links
 Description and image of the order

Orders, decorations, and medals of Turkmenistan